Afan may refer to:

 Afan (trail), see 
 Afan, Iran, a village in Mangur-e Sharqi Rural District, Khalifan District, Mahabad County, West Azerbaijan Province, Iran
 River Afan or Avon or Avan, a river in southwest Wales
 Saint Afan, Welsh bishop and saint of the 6th century